A certified pre-owned car or CPO is a type of used car. It's also used in references to guns and phones. The term "certified pre-owned was conceived by corporations in order to find a more favorable alternative to marketing products as 'used,' which causes consumers to impose their cognitive biases associated with 'used' items onto prospective purchases. There is no distinction or standard as to what is the difference between a used item and a certified pre-owned one, except that it is implied the certified pre-owned has been inspected and confirmed as working. Inspection, refurbishing, certification of functioning and other methods are sometimes employed by companies, but there is no standard for what distinguishes that which is certified pre-owned from something that is used.

Description 

Certified pre-owned vehicles may be late models, differing from other used cars by having been inspected, refurbished, and certified by a manufacturer or other certifying authority. They also typically include an extended warranty, special financing, and additional benefits. Luxury marques Lexus and Mercedes-Benz were among the first to create certified pre-owned programs in the 1990s. There are variations as to what is termed certified pre-owned, so the distinctions are important. Manufacturer (or "factory") certified pre-owned vehicles are only sold at authorized dealers specializing in that particular franchise. Factory certified pre-owned cars are generally five years old or newer and have less than 80,000 miles. They often cost more than vehicles certified by independent authorities, and are higher priced than a non-certified used vehicle. Independent programs can represent good value and an alternative to an OEM program. Independents may hold a vehicle to a higher standard than an OEM, or may be less stringent in their inspections. Independents include brands such as the National Vehicle Certification Program, Carmark, and others. Dealer-certified programs represent a third category, as they are often promoted as certified pre-owned. These vehicles generally have not been inspected by anyone outside the dealership, but do typically carry a warranty or extended service contract to provide some protection to the consumer.

With any certified pre-owned program, who does the actual inspection and reconditioning repairs may be significant. Both OEM and dealer-certified program vehicles are typically inspected by employees of the selling dealer—not by the manufacturer as may be assumed. Independents may employ a disinterested third-party inspector to ensure objectivity, or may allow the dealer to inspect their own vehicles.

Because warranties, vehicle inspection points, and other program components will vary, prospective buyers would be wise to decide what defines CPO for themselves, by comparing the programs to determine what best represents their needs and expectations.

Used vehicle certification is the process of certifying to a warranty company that the vehicle has no issues. This has been a process car dealerships have done for almost 50 years. In the 1990s manufactures began using the term "certified vehicle" in advertising. The warranties attached to a certified car are the same extended warranties dealers have offered customers in the finance office at time of sale. Penetration percentages were low so the end buyer was taken out of the decision making process and the warranty was sold from the service department to the used car department via the "used car check out or certification".

See also
Carcannon, automotive inspection and consulting company

Notes

References

Westways, November/December 2005, p. 48, "Automotive Overdrive" column, "Alphabet Soup", by Peter Bohr

Used car market